The Orekhovka (formerly Сандо-Вака Sando-Vaka) is a river in Dalnerechensky District, Primorsky Krai, Russia. It is the longest tributary of Malinovka, which it enters about 111 km from the Malnikova's confluence with the Bolshaya Ussurka.

There are two hydrologic posts on the river near the villages of Polyany and Yasnaya Polyana.

References

Rivers of Primorsky Krai